The Venkata hill (853 m) is part of the Seshachalam Hills, located in the Tirupati district of Andhra Pradesh, India. Also known as Venkatadri or Venkatachalam, it is one of the seven peaks of the Tirumala Hill located in the temple town of Tirumala. The popular Tirumala Venkateswara Temple is located on this hill. It is dedicated to the Hindu god Venkateswara, a form of Vishnu, also known as Tirupati or Balaji.

References

Hills of Andhra Pradesh
Hindu pilgrimage sites in India
Geography of Tirupati district